Dissen is an unincorporated community in Cape Girardeau County, in the U.S. state of Missouri.

The community was named after Dissen, in Germany, the native land of a share of the first settlers.

References

Unincorporated communities in Cape Girardeau County, Missouri
Unincorporated communities in Missouri